Arhopala pseudovihara is a butterfly of the family Lycaenidae first described by Hisakazu Hayashi in 1981. It is found on the Philippine islands of Mindanao, Leyte and Mindoro.

References

  (1981). "New Lycaenid Butterflies from the Philippines". Tyô to Ga. 32 (1,2): 63–82.
 
  (2005). "A revision of Arhopala aedias (Hewitson, 1862) and its allied species from the Philippines (Lepidoptera: Lycaenidae)". Butterflies (Teinopalpus) 41: 19–26.
  (2012) "Revised checklist of the butterflies of the Philippine Islands". Nachrichten des Entomologischen Vereins Apollo. Suppl. 20: 1-64.

Butterflies described in 1981
Arhopala
Butterflies of Asia